Everyone Everywhere is an American emo band from Philadelphia, Pennsylvania.

History
Everyone Everywhere formed in 2007. They have released two self-titled albums, two EPs, and one split with Into It. Over It. since then.

Personnel
Brendan McHugh - guitar, vocals
Brendan Graham - drums
Matt Scottoline - bass
Tommy Manson - guitar

Discography
Studio albums
Everyone Everywhere (2010)
Everyone Everywhere (2012)
EPs
Pants (2007)
A Lot Of Weird People Standing Around (2008)
Splits
Into It. Over It. / Everyone Everywhere (2010)
Compilations
Everyone Everywhere (2021)

References

External links
 Official website

Musical groups from Philadelphia
Musical groups established in 2007
American emo musical groups
Topshelf Records artists
Emo revival groups
Doghouse Records artists
Tiny Engines artists